Harvard Works Because We Do is a book of photographs by Gregory Halpern. The book was published in 2003 by Quantuck Lane / W. W. Norton, with an introduction by Studs Terkel. The photographs, compiled by Halpern while an undergraduate at Harvard University, document the lives of Harvard workers.

The photographs and the book was part of a living wage campaign at Harvard University. The activism called the minimum wage of Harvard workers being raised from $8 to $10.25 to match the minimum wage of Cambridge, Massachusetts, where the school is located. The campaign succeeded in getting the minimum wage raised to $11.35 for janitors and  $11.15 for security guards.

References

External links
 Harvard Works Because We Do, within Halpern's site
 Review of the book in The New York Times, 2003
 Review of the book in The Boston Globe, 2003

2003 non-fiction books
Harvard University
W. W. Norton & Company books
Photographic collections and books